1717 Arlon, provisional designation , is a binary Florian asteroid from the inner regions of the asteroid belt, approximately 8.5 kilometers in diameter.

It was discovered on 8 January 1954, by Belgian astronomer Sylvain Arend at the Royal Observatory of Belgium in Uccle, Belgium, and later named for the Belgian town and provincial capital, Arlon.

Classification and orbit 

Arlon is a member of the Flora family, a collisional family of S-type asteroids asteroids, and one of the largest populations of the main-belt. It orbits the Sun in the inner main-belt at a distance of 1.9–2.5 AU once every 3 years and 3 months (1,188 days). Its orbit has an eccentricity of 0.13 and an inclination of 6° with respect to the ecliptic.

Binary system

Primary 

A large number of rotational lightcurves of Arlon were obtained from photometric observations, giving a well-defined rotation period between 5.1477 and 5.1496 hours with a small brightness variation of 0.10 magnitude or less (also see infobox).

Secondary 

During one of these photometric observations in 2006, the binary nature of Arlon was revealed. The discovered asteroid moon orbits its primary once every 18.2 hours, at a distance of 16 kilometers. The moon itself measures approximately 4 kilometers in diameter.

Diameter and albedo 

According to the surveys carried out by the Japanese Akari satellite and NASA's Wide-field Infrared Survey Explorer with its subsequent NEOWISE mission, Arlon measures between 8.48 and 9.15 kilometers in diameter and its surface has an albedo between 0.167 and 0.315. The Collaborative Asteroid Lightcurve Link agrees with the revised WISE-results by Pravec, adopting an albedo of 0.225 and a diameter of 9.15 kilometers with an absolute magnitude of 12.43.

Naming 

This minor planet was named for the Belgian town, municipality and provincial capital, Arlon. It is located on a hill above the source of the Semois river. In ancient times, Arlon was known as Orolaunum by the Romans and served as a station on the Antoninian way linking the cities Trier with Reims. The approved naming citation was published by the Minor Planet Center on 22 September 1983.

Notes

References

External links 
 Asteroids with Satellites, Robert Johnston, johnstonsarchive.net
 Asteroid Lightcurve Database (LCDB), query form (info )
 Dictionary of Minor Planet Names, Google books
 Asteroids and comets rotation curves, CdR – Observatoire de Genève, Raoul Behrend
 Discovery Circumstances: Numbered Minor Planets (1)-(5000)  – Minor Planet Center
 
 

001717
Discoveries by Sylvain Arend
Named minor planets
001717
1717 Arlon
001717
19540108